Piz Sena (also known as Vetta Sperella) is a mountain of the Livigno Alps, located on the border between Italy and Switzerland. On its (Swiss) western side it overlooks Poschiavo.

References

External links
 Piz Sena on Hikr

Mountains of the Alps
Alpine three-thousanders
Mountains of Graubünden
Mountains of Lombardy
Italy–Switzerland border
International mountains of Europe
Mountains of Switzerland
Poschiavo